Dan Fogel is an American jazz organist playing the Hammond B-3 organ.

Biography
Jazz organist Dan Fogel was born June 21, 1948, in Atlantic City, New Jersey. Fogel purchased his first organ by age 11. At age 13 he began playing in nightclubs in Atlantic City.

Fogel has worked with Pat Martino, Odean Pope, Billy James, Sunny Murray, Cecil Payne, Tony Ventura, Rufus Harley, Monnette Sudler, Harvey Mason, O'Donel Levy, and Bootsie Barnes.

In 2012 Down Beat magazine critics voted Fogel a Rising Star on the Hammond B-3 organ.

He died on August 11, 2021.

Discography

References

External links
 www.danfogel.org
 Dan Fogel on YouTube
 [ Dan Fogel on AllMusic]

American jazz organists
American male organists
1948 births
Living people
21st-century organists
21st-century American male musicians
American male jazz musicians
21st-century American keyboardists